Erik Wemple is an American journalist who works as a columnist and media critic at The Washington Post. He was formerly the editor of the alternative weekly Washington City Paper.

Early life
Wemple was raised in Niskayuna, New York, and attended Hamilton College in Clinton, New York, graduating in 1986.

Career
Wemple began contributing articles to the Washington City Paper in the late 1990s. From January 1999 to November 2000, Wemple wrote the paper's political column, "Loose Lips", before becoming editor.  Previously, he was Washington correspondent for Inside.com and CableWorld magazine.

In 2004, the Association of Alternative Newsweeklies awarded Wemple and Josh Levin an Alternative Newsweekly Award for their article "Off Target", published in Washington City Paper.

In June 2006, Wemple accepted the editor-in-chief position at The Village Voice. A month later, he announced he would not assume the position, stating that "the paper's ownership and I have failed to come to terms in our many discussions about moving forward, particularly with respect to newsroom management."

In February 2010, Wemple informed the staff of the Washington City Paper that he was leaving to be the new editor of TBD.com.

In 2013, J. K. Trotter of Gawker Media declared Wemple a "hero", and that "like a deeply embedded anthropologist, Wemple scours Washington media (and, not infrequently, their New York counterparts) for hypocrisy, excess, and corruption. He's the anti-Mike Allen, frequently piercing the Politico's madman's self-inflating bubble of hype at the moment it threatens to blot out the sun."

In February 2017, Wemple appeared on Tucker Carlsons show to discuss media bias. In the interview Carlson criticized Wemple for not covering  mistakes made by The Washington Post where Wemple worked. In 2021, Carlson criticized Wemple for contacting several of his college classmates and attempting to find "naughty" things he had done when he was 19. Carlson compared Wemple's investigation into him to  that of investigations politicians subject their political opponents too.

Personal life 
Wemple is married to Stephanie Mencimer, who, as of 2018, worked as a staff reporter in the Washington office of Mother Jones.

Notes

External links
 Erik Wemple at The Washington Post

1964 births
Living people
Hamilton College (New York) alumni
Place of birth missing (living people)
Writers from Schenectady, New York
The Washington Post people
Journalists from New York (state)
20th-century American journalists
21st-century American newspaper editors
American media critics
20th-century American male writers
21st-century American male writers
American male journalists